Sky Raiders is a 1931 film directed by Christy Cabanne and starring Lloyd Hughes and Marceline Day. Produced by Columbia Pictures, it was filmed at Grand Central Air Terminal, now Grand Central Airport, in Glendale, California.

Plot
Hughes plays Bob, a daredevil aviator in love with Grace (Day). Bob's reckless behavior and addiction to alcohol causes the death of Grace's brother, and Bob subsequently loses his job and Grace's love.  Bob puts his life back together and catches a gang of hijackers who were robbing gold shipments from mid-air flights.

References

External links
 
 
 
 

1931 films
Columbia Pictures films
American black-and-white films
1931 adventure films
American adventure films
1931 crime films
American crime films
1930s English-language films
1930s American films